Elections to Epsom and Ewell Borough Council were held on Thursday 5 May 2011 in line with other local elections in the United Kingdom. All 38 seats across 13 wards of this Non-metropolitan district were up for election.

Election result summary

Ward results

References

2011 English local elections
2011
2010s in Surrey